The internal anal sphincter, IAS, (or sphincter ani internus) is a ring of smooth muscle that surrounds about 2.5–4.0 cm of the anal canal; its inferior border is in contact with, but quite separate from, the external anal sphincter. It is myogenic in nature and playing phasic and tonic state for relaxation and contraction. This myogenic tone is based on Ca2+/Calmodulin/MLCK/RhoA/ROCK signaling cascade pathway. Recent studies suggested, BDNF is the member of the neurotrophin family; having next target for basal IAS and NANC relaxation.

It is about 5 mm thick, and is formed by an aggregation of the involuntary circular fibers of the rectum. Its lower border is about 6 mm from the orifice of the anus.

Actions
Its action is entirely involuntary, and it is in a state of continuous maximal contraction. It helps the Sphincter ani externus to occlude the anal aperture and aids in the expulsion of the feces. Sympathetic fibers from the superior rectal and hypogastric plexuses stimulate and maintain internal anal sphincter contraction. Its contraction is inhibited by parasympathetic fiber stimulation. This sphincter is tonically contracted most of the time to prevent leakage of fluid or gas, but is relaxed upon distention of the rectal ampulla, requiring voluntary contraction of the puborectalis and external anal sphincter. The internal anal sphincter is not innervated by the pudendal nerve, which carries somatic (motor and sensory) fibers that provide the innervation to the external anal sphincter.

Role in continence
The IAS contributes 55% of the resting pressure of the anal canal. It is very important for bowel continence, especially for liquid and gas. When the rectum fills beyond a certain capacity, the rectal walls are distended, triggering the defecation cycle. This begins with the rectoanal inhibitory reflex (RAIR), where the IAS relaxes. This is thought to allow a small amount of rectal contents to descend into the anal canal where specialized mucosa samples whether it is gas, liquid or solid. Problems with the IAS often present as degrees of fecal incontinence (especially partial incontinence to liquid) or mucous rectal discharge.

Regenerative medicine
In 2011 it was announced by the Wake Forest School of Medicine that the first bioengineered, functional anal sphincters had been constructed in a laboratory made from muscle and nerve cells, providing a solution for anal incontinence.

Additional images

See also
External anal sphincter
Levator ani

References

External links
 

Perineum
Anus